The rivers of New Zealand are used for a variety of purposes and face a number of environmental issues. In the North Island's hill country the rivers are deep, fast flowing and most are unnavigable. Many of the rivers in the South Island are braided rivers. The navigable rivers were used for mass transport in the early history of New Zealand.

Statistics

Some of the rivers, especially those with wide flood plains and stop banks, have long road bridges spanning them. The third longest bridge is the Whirokino Trestle Bridge on State Highway 1 crossing the Manawatū River.

Over  of rivers have been mapped in New Zealand.

Uses

Before colonisation, Māori frequently used the navigable rivers (waterways) for transportation. Waka (canoes) made of hollowed-out logs were the main mode of navigating rivers. During the early European settler years, coastal shipping was one of the main methods of transportation.

Rivers are used for commercial tourism and recreation activities such as rafting, canoeing, kayaking and jet-boating. Bungy jumping, pioneered as a commercial venture by a New Zealand innovator, is often done above some of the more scenic rivers.

Over half of the electricity generated in New Zealand is hydroelectric power. Hydroelectric power stations have been constructed on many rivers, some of which dam the river completely while others channel a portion of the water through the power station. Some of the large hydroelectric power schemes in both North Island and South Island use a system of canals to move water between catchments in order to maximise electricity generation.

Conservation and pollution

River conservation is threatened by pollution inflows from point and non-point sources. In the past rivers had been used for pollution discharges from factories and municipal sewerage plants.  With increasing environmental awareness and the passing of the Resource Management Act 1991, these sources of pollution are now less problematic. Water abstraction, especially for irrigation, is now a major threat to the character of rivers. An upsurge in conversion of land to dairy farming is stretching water resources. Also, since dairy farming is becoming more intensified in New Zealand and requires large amounts of water, the problem is therefore being exacerbated.

Acid mine drainage (AMD) from the Stockton coal mine has altered the ecology of the Mangatini Stream on the West Coast. The Stockton mine is also leaching AMD into the Waimangaroa River and the proposed Cypress Mine will increase this amount.

There is a high level of pollution in lowland rivers and streams that flow through urban or pastoral farming areas.

A report from the Ministry of Economic Development identified a large number of rivers as being suitable for hydroelectric power production.  This report alarmed the Green Party and a number of environmental organisations due to the fear of an increasing loss of scenic rivers and rivers that have a high degree of natural character.

See also
Water in New Zealand
Environment of New Zealand
Water conservation orders in New Zealand
Lakes of New Zealand
Bridges in New Zealand
New Zealand Hydrological Society

References

Further reading

External links

National Institute of Water & Atmospheric Research – National Centre for Water Resources
Wild Rivers – a campaign to protect rivers
Whitewater NZ (formerly New Zealand Recreational Canoeing Association)
Ministry for the Environment – water information page
League table of the suitability of New Zealand rivers for contact recreation from NIWA